The mixed skeet was a shooting sports event held as part of the Shooting at the 1976 Summer Olympics programme. It was the third appearance of the event. The competition was held on 22 to 24 July 1976 at the shooting ranges in Montreal. 68 shooters from 39 nations competed.

Results

References

Shooting at the 1976 Summer Olympics